Kitta or Koita is a village in the Mani peninsula, Laconia, Greece. It is part of the municipal unit of Oitylo. It is built on top of a hill, overlooking the sea. Kitta is known for its many Maniot pyrgoi (war towers). Partially abandoned, the village had a population of 96 at the 2011 census. Much of the population left between World War II and today.  It was the scene of Mani's last vendetta, in 1870 which required the intervention of the army, with artillery to halt it. It is among the oldest villages in Mani, being mentioned in the Iliad as "Messes", a village in Menelaus' kingdom.

Subdivisions
The villages in the community of Koita are (population at 2011 census): 
Agios Georgios (18)
Ano Gardenitsa (34)
Archia (3) 
Kalonioi (24) 
Kato Gardenitsa (8)
Kechrianika (5)
Koita (96)
Nomia (15)
Psi (9)

See also

List of settlements in Laconia

References 

Populated places in the Mani Peninsula
Populated places in Laconia
East Mani